Tin Hrvoj (born 6 June 2001) is a Croatian footballer who plays as a right-back for Slovenian club Radomlje.

Career statistics

Club

References

2001 births
Living people
Footballers from Zagreb
Croatian footballers
Association football fullbacks
Croatia youth international footballers
First Football League (Croatia) players
Croatian Football League players
Slovenian PrvaLiga players
GNK Dinamo Zagreb II players
GNK Dinamo Zagreb players
NK Hrvatski Dragovoljac players
NK Radomlje players
Croatian expatriate footballers
Croatian expatriate sportspeople in Slovenia
Expatriate footballers in Slovenia